Bank and Monument are two interlinked stations in the City of London that form a public transport complex served by five lines of the London Underground as well as the Docklands Light Railway (DLR). 

Bank station, named after the Bank of England, opened in 1900 at Bank Junction and is served by the Central, Northern and Waterloo & City lines, and the DLR. Monument station, named after the Monument to the Great Fire of London, opened in 1884 and is served by the District and Circle lines. The stations have been linked as an interchange since 1933.

The station complex is one of the busiest on the London Underground network. The station complex was rated the Underground's worst station in passenger surveys, and a substantial upgrade and expansion was completed in 2023 after 7 years of construction. The station has 27 escalators, the most of any station on the Underground. The stations are in fare zone 1.

History

The Bank–Monument station complex was created by building links between several nearby stations constructed by different companies. The first station was opened by the Metropolitan Inner Circle Completion Railway.

Metropolitan Inner Circle Completion Railway, 1884

The Metropolitan Railway (MR) and District Railway (DR) had, by 1876, built most of the Inner Circle (now the Circle line), reaching  and  respectively. The companies were in dispute over the completion of the route as the DR was struggling financially and the MR was concerned that completion would affect its revenues through increased competition from the DR in the City area. City financiers keen to see the line completed established the Metropolitan Inner Circle Completion Railway in 1874 to link Mansion House to Aldgate. Forced into action, the MR bought out the company and with the DR began construction of the final section of the Inner Circle in 1879. The new section of railway included two new stations: Tower of London and another located close to the Monument.

The station at Monument opened with the name "Eastcheap" on 6 October 1884, after the nearby street, and was renamed "The Monument" on 1 November 1884. Initially, trains from both companies served the station on the Inner Circle service but other operational patterns have been used. The Inner Circle service achieved a separate identity as the Circle line in 1949 although its trains were still provided by the District or Metropolitan lines.

Waterloo & City Railway, 1898 
The Waterloo & City Railway was built by the London and South Western Railway (L&SWR) to link its terminus at Waterloo to the City. The station, with platforms under Queen Victoria Street and close to Mansion House, opened on 8 August 1898 as "City".

The Waterloo and City line platforms were renamed "Bank" on 28 October 1940. In September 1960, the steeply sloping passages to the platforms were supplemented with the "Travolator", one of the few sets of moving walkways on the whole underground system. Advertising at the Waterloo & City line station often takes the form of large painted murals on the walls and ceilings of the sloped exits, forming one of the largest advertisements on the Underground.

As the W&CR was owned by the L&SWR, a mainline railway, it became part of British Rail; it was only transferred to Underground operation in 1994.

City & South London Railway, 1900 

The earlier terminus of the line, on a different tunnel alignment was closed at the same time.

The C&SLR had obtained permission to demolish the 18th-century church of St Mary Woolnoth on the corner of Lombard Street and build a station (originally proposed to be named "Lombard Street") on the site. After public protest, the company changed its plans to build only a sub-surface ticket hall and lift entrance in the crypt of the church. This necessitated moving the bodies elsewhere, strengthening the crypt with a steel framework and underpinning the church's foundations. Unusually for stations later converted to escalators, the original lift access from the ticket hall is still in use.

Central London Railway, 1900 

The opening of the eastern terminus of the Central London Railway (CLR, now the Central line) at Bank followed on 30 July 1900.

As with the C&SLR, the high cost of property in the City, coupled with the presence of the Royal Exchange, the Bank of England, and Mansion House, meant that the station had to be built entirely underground. Permission was granted by the City of London Corporation for the station to be sited beneath the busy junction of roads meeting at this point on condition that public subways were provided to act as pedestrian road crossings. To avoid undermining the road above, the station's lifts were installed in separate lift shafts rather than paired two-per-shaft as usual.

To avoid wayleave payments to property owners and to lessen possible claims for damage during construction and operation, the CLR tunnels were directly under public streets.  This caused the platforms under Threadneedle Street and Poultry to be so curved that one end of the platform cannot be seen from the other. East of Bank station the Central line tunnels have sharp curves to avoid the vaults of the Bank of England itself. Due to the close proximity of the CLR, W&CR and C&SLR stations, and the non-competing directions of their services, their ticket halls were soon connected, but connection between the CLR and C&SLR platforms were made only when escalators were installed in 1924. The Central London Railway station itself was reconstructed during the major rebuilding of the Bank of England in 1925. The booking hall underneath Bank junction was redecorated and a new subway entrance built into the corner of the Bank itself.

Monument link, 1933

The southern end of the C&SLR (by then part of the Edgware-Highgate-Morden line) platforms was close to those of Monument station and, on 18 September 1933, a connecting escalator link was opened, connecting the two stations directly for the first time.

World War II

During the Blitz, the station was used as a bomb shelter. On 11 January 1941 during World War II the Central line ticket hall of Bank station suffered a direct hit from a German bomb. The roadway collapsed into the subways and station concourse, killing 56 people.

Docklands Light Railway and station refurbishment, 1990s
In 1991, the Docklands Light Railway was extended to Bank station, following criticism of the original, poorly connected terminus at Tower Gateway. The new platforms were built parallel to but deeper than those of the Northern line, with connections at one end to the Central line and Monument Station at the other. As part of the construction of the extension, a new link between the Waterloo & City and the Central line was excavated – uncovering part of one of the Greathead tunnelling shields used for the Waterloo and City line. This shield forms part of the new passageway, and passengers pass through when transferring between the two lines. As with all other DLR stations, the DLR platforms are accessible, however the route is indirect with the use of three different passenger lifts required to reach the DLR.

In January 1994, a statue of James Henry Greathead was erected outside the station, next to the Royal Exchange. It was unveiled by the Lord Mayor of London and is positioned on a plinth which hides a ventilation shaft for the Underground.

The rest of the station was comprehensively refurbished, with decorative tiling panels based on the City's coat of arms, new lighting and replacement of escalators. This work was completed in 1997, partially funded by the City of London Corporation.

New Bloomberg entrance, 2010s
In the late 2010s, a new entrance was constructed at Bloomberg's new London headquarters on Walbrook, near  station, providing direct access to the Waterloo & City line via four new escalators and two lifts – providing step free access to that line for the first time. First announced in 2008, construction began in November 2015 following delays due to the financial crisis. The new entrance was opened on 30 November 2018, and was officially opened by Mayor of London Sadiq Khan and former Mayor of New York Michael Bloomberg in December 2018.

The new entrance incorporates etched glass panels by artist John Hutton, depicting 66 figures based on the ancient Roman history of the area, including the Roman Temple of Mithras. The artwork was originally completed in 1962 on Bucklersbury House, the post war office building previously located on the site.

Station upgrade and expansion 

Between 2003 to 2014, demand at the Bank–Monument station complex rose by over 50% to 337,000 customers per day. The station complex was also rated the Underground's worst station in passenger surveys. 

According to Transport for London (TfL), "areas of the station are close to 'saturation' point, where day to day demand overwhelms capacity". Unlike other congested stations such as Oxford Circus, passengers cannot be held back at station entrances during peak times to avoid overwhelming the station, as around half of passengers are interchanging between lines. The high demand on the station is exacerbated by the narrow passageways, pinch points, spiral staircases and indirect routes between lines. Some parts of the station operate "one way", with staff directing passengers on longer routes to increase the capacity of the station. 

Given these issues, the station complex was substantially upgraded between 2016 and 2023, increasing capacity by 40%, at a cost of around £700million. The overall project – incorporating twelve new escalators, two new lifts and two moving walkways – included:

 A new southbound platform for the Northern line and conversion of the existing southbound platform to passenger circulation space.
 New direct passenger tunnel with moving walkways connecting the Northern line and Central line.
 New escalators between the Northern line and the DLR
 A new station entrance and ticket hall on Cannon Street, just east of St Mary Abchurch, with new escalators and step free access to the Northern line and DLR.
 Modernising the station to comply with contemporary fire and evacuation standards.
Owing to the severe curvature of the Central line platforms, there is a substantial gap between the train and the platform. Because of this, no step-free access was currently proposed for the Central line, as the cost would be prohibitive and it would be difficult for passengers to use.

TfL described the construction of the project as "intricate and complicated", with over 30 listed buildings in the historic City of London located above the tunnels. The new southbound Northern line tunnel was dug from a worksite on King William Street, using the underground spaces left over from the closed King William Street tube station. Former running tunnels have previously been used as circulation space at Angel and London Bridge stations.

As part of the development of the scheme, TfL worked with potential bidders to improve the design of the station from TfL's original design. The design proposed in the winning bid by Dragados was 9.7% cheaper than the original design (saving TfL £60million), took ten months less time to construct than the original design (the proposed closure of the Northern line was also five weeks shorter), and the layout of the station was more efficient. This improved the benefit–cost ratio by 45%, from 2.4:1 to 3.5:1.

Progress 
Following consultations in the early 2010s, and a Transport and Works Act Order in 2015, construction of the new Northern line tunnel began in April 2016, and was estimated to take six years. By July 2019, the project had reached the halfway stage. By July 2021, installation of escalators was underway, as well as preparation work to connect to the new Northern line tunnels in 2022. From January until mid May 2022, the Northern line through Bank was closed – this was required to allow the existing line to be connected to the new running tunnels, convert the previous southbound platform to a new passenger concourse, as well as final fit-out and integration works throughout the expanded station complex.On 15 May 2022, the new Northern line southbound platform and concourse was opened, the first part of the station expansion open to the public. On 13 October 2022, new escalators connecting the DLR and the Northern line opened. On 28 October 2022, a moving walkway between the Central and Northern lines was opened. These new connections cut the time taken to interchange between lines, as well as expanding the capacity of the station. On 27 February 2023, the project was completed with the opening of the new Cannon Street entrance, as well as lifts providing step free access to the Northern line and the DLR. The station has 27 escalators, the most of any station on the Underground.

Ticket halls and entrances 
Following the opening of the Cannon Street entrance in 2023, the station complex has sixteen entrances and five ticket halls, the most of any station on the Underground.

 Bullring (Central line) ticket hall, located underneath Bank Junction.
 Lombard Street (Northern line) ticket hall, located under Lombard Street.
 Monument ticket hall, located under Monument Street adjacent to the Monument to the Great Fire of London, serving the District & Circle lines.
 Walbrook ticket hall, at Bloomberg London, serving the Waterloo & City line.
 Cannon Street ticket hall, on Cannon Street located just east of St Mary Abchurch.

Notable events 
On 11 January 1941, during the Blitz, 56 people were killed and 69 were seriously injured when a German bomb hit the booking hall, with the blast travelling down the stairs and escalators to the platforms. The station itself was closed for two months.

On 7 September 2003, Bank station was used for a disaster training exercise, Exercise Osiris, billed as "the most realistic live disaster exercise of its kind". The event, lasting several hours and involving about 500 police, fire brigade, ambulance and London Underground personnel, was intended to prepare the emergency services for mass decontamination in the event of a chemical, biological, radiological or nuclear attack.

Connections
A large number of London Bus routes serve the station complex day and night.

References

External links

 
 
 
 London Transport Museum Photographic Archive
 
 
 
 
 
 
 

Central line (London Underground) stations
Northern line stations
Circle line (London Underground) stations
District line stations
Docklands Light Railway stations in the City of London
Waterloo & City line stations
Bank station
Tube stations in the City of London
Former Metropolitan and Metropolitan District Joint Railway stations
Railway stations in Great Britain opened in 1884
Former City and South London Railway stations
Former Central London Railway stations
Railway stations in Great Britain opened in 1900